A Westphal balance (also known as a Mohr balance) is a scientific instrument for measuring the density of liquids.

References

Historical scientific instruments